Bagan Mukim (also known as Mukim 2) is located in Batu Pahat district in Johor. Batu Pahat district is divided into 14 mukims, each covering several villages.

External links 

Mukims of Batu Pahat District